Leonel Eduardo Pilipauskas Rodríguez (born 18 May 1975) is a Uruguayan retired professional footballer who played as a defensive midfielder, and is the assistant manager of Bella Vista.

Club career
Pilipauskas was born in Montevideo. In his country, he played for C.A. Bella Vista, Peñarol and Centro Atlético Fénix. This was punctuated by a spell with Spanish club Atlético Madrid in the 1999–2000 season, which was anything but successful (only four La Liga matches, relegation to Segunda División).

In 2005, Pilipauskas moved to neighbouring Argentina, going on to represent Instituto Atlético Central Córdoba and Club Atlético Platense, the former in the Primera División. He briefly returned to Fénix in between.

International career
Pilipauskas made four appearances for Uruguay during 1999, including two matches at that year's Copa América. His debut came on 17 June in a friendly with Paraguay, in Ciudad del Este.

Coaching career
In January 2020, Pilipauskas returned to Bella Vista as an assistant manager under Jorge Casanova.

Honours

Club
Peñarol
Uruguayan Primera División: 2003

Country
Uruguay
Copa América: Runner-up 1999

References

External links
 Argentine League statistics  
 
 National team data 
 
 

1975 births
Living people
Uruguayan people of Lithuanian descent
Footballers from Montevideo
Uruguayan footballers
Association football midfielders
Uruguayan Primera División players
Uruguayan Segunda División players
C.A. Bella Vista players
Peñarol players
Centro Atlético Fénix players
Deportivo Maldonado players
Boston River players
La Liga players
Atlético Madrid footballers
Argentine Primera División players
Primera Nacional players
Instituto footballers
Club Atlético Platense footballers
Uruguay international footballers
1999 Copa América players
Uruguayan expatriate footballers
Expatriate footballers in Spain
Expatriate footballers in Argentina
Uruguayan expatriate sportspeople in Argentina